Sukchar or Sukhchar is a locality which consists of two municipalities: Panihati & Khardah under Barrackpore subdivision of  North 24 Parganas district in the Indian state of West Bengal. It is close to Kolkata and also a part of the area covered by Kolkata Metropolitan Development Authority.This area is served by the Khardah police station of Barrackpore Police Commissionerate.Sukchar has many historical & religious significance.

Geography
Sukchar is mainly consists of whole 1, 2 no ward & western part of 14 no ward of  Panihati Municipality but also southern part of ward no 20,21,22 of Khardah Municipality has considered as sukchar. Old Sukcar mouza area (622acre) was greater than present sukchar postal area (pin 700115).

Kolkata Urban Agglomeration
The following Municipalities, Census Towns and other locations in Barrackpore subdivision were part of Kolkata Urban Agglomeration in the 2011 census: Kanchrapara (M), Jetia (CT), Halisahar (M), Balibhara (CT), Naihati (M), Bhatpara (M), Kaugachhi (CT), Garshyamnagar (CT), Garulia (M), Ichhapur Defence Estate (CT), North Barrackpur (M), Barrackpur Cantonment (CB), Barrackpore (M), Jafarpur (CT), Ruiya (CT), Titagarh (M), Khardaha (M), Bandipur (CT), Panihati (M), Muragachha (CT) New Barrackpore (M), Chandpur (CT), Talbandha (CT), Patulia (CT), Kamarhati (M), Baranagar (M), South Dumdum (M), North Dumdum (M), Dum Dum (M), Noapara (CT), Babanpur (CT), Teghari (CT), Nanna (OG), Chakla (OG), Srotribati (OG) and Panpur (OG).

Sukchar Post office (pin 700115) is situated at 1 no ward of Panihati Municipality.

Transport 

The place is well connected by both roadways and railways. B.T. Road passes through Sukchar.

78 is the most frequent bus in Sukchar which runs from Barrackpore Court to Esplanade. Besides many buses connect Sukchar to various neighbourhoods - 81/1 (Barasat to Rajchandrapur), 214A (Sodepur Girja/Sukchar Church to Esplanade), C28 and S32 (Barrackpore Court to Howrah Station), S11 (Nilganj to Esplanade), E32 (Nilganj to Howrah Station) etc.

Khardaha railway station and Sodepur railway station on the Sealdah-Ranaghat line are located nearby.

Education 

The high schools here are:

 Sukchar karmadaksha chandrachur vidyayatan (for boys) (Bengali medium),
 Sukchar satadal balika vidyayatan (for girls) (Bengali medium),
 St. Xavier's Institution (Co-Education) (English medium),
 Sukchar Kedarnath Poddar High School (Co-Education) (Hindi medium)

The primary schools here are:

 Sukchar Bhawanipur Prathomik Vidyayatan (Co-Education) (Bengali medium),
 Sukchar Kedarnath Poddar Primary School (Co-Education) (Hindi medium),
 Sukchar Nolin Smriti Vidyayatan (Co-Education) (Bengali medium),
 Sukchar Jayprakash Nagar Prathomik Vidyayatan (Co-Education) (Bengali medium),
 St. Xavier's Institution (Co-Education) (English medium),
 Sukchar Kalitala Primary School (Co-Education) (Bengali medium),
 sukchar satadal balika vidyayatan (Prathamik Vibhag) (Co-Education) (Bengali medium)

Most of the people in Sukchar are service personnel either in Government sector, semi- government sector or in private sectors. There are some industries running successfully in the vicinity of this area. Sukchar has got many historical aspects like resthouse of Rabindranath Tagore, Baromandir Ghat, Kalitala Ghat, Bazar Para Ghat.

Religious places
 Sukchar Kalitala Siddheshwari Kali Mandir
 Kathia Baba Ashram
 Balak Brahmachari Ashram
 Tin Murti Mandir
 Sri Sai Devsthan
 Dayanada Ashram

References

External links 

Cities and towns in North 24 Parganas district
Neighbourhoods in Kolkata
Kolkata Metropolitan Area
Neighbourhoods in North 24 Parganas district